Band of Gold is the third studio album by Freda Payne. Her first for Invictus Records, it was released in 1970. The title track became an instant smash on the Pop charts in the US and the UK. Other hits included "Unhooked Generation" (released before "Band of Gold") and "Deeper and Deeper". The tenth track was written by Payne's younger sister, Scherrie Payne. Cover versions include Gary Puckett and the Union Gap's hit "This Girl Is a Woman Now" and Andy Williams' hit "Happy Heart".

The album peaked at No. 60 on the Billboard 200. "Band of Gold" reached No. 1 on the UK Singles Chart. It, and "Deeper and Deeper", have sold more than a million copies worldwide.

Critical reception
AllMusic called the album "a masterpiece of epic proportions," writing that "the overall sonic tone of Band of Gold reflects [Payne's] producers' Motown history."

Track listing

Personnel
Recorded at: Holland-Dozier-Holland Sound Studios, Inc.
L.T. Horn – recording engineer
Processed by: Syntrex
William Weatherspoon – production supervision
Bob Wortham – cover photography

Charts

Album

Singles

References 

1970 albums
Freda Payne albums
Albums produced by Brian Holland
Albums produced by Lamont Dozier
Invictus Records albums
Albums produced by Edward Holland Jr.